Javid Shokri  is an Iranian football midfielder who played for Iran and Esteghlal F.C.

References

External links
 
 Javeed Shoukri at TeamMelli.com

Iran international footballers
Iranian footballers
Esteghlal F.C. players
Living people
Sportspeople from Tabriz
Machine Sazi F.C. players
Association football midfielders
Year of birth missing (living people)